Cynthia Apolonia Ortega-Martijn (born 9 February 1956 in Willemstad, Curaçao) is a former Dutch politician. As a member of the ChristianUnion (ChristenUnie) she was an MP from November 30, 2006, to September 19, 2012. She focused on matters of economical affairs, social affairs, employment, integration, housing and Netherlands Antilles affairs.

Ortega obtained a bachelor's degree in labour market policies and human resource policies. At the Open University in the Netherlands she obtained a master's degree in human resource management.

References

External links
  Parlement.com biography

1956 births
Living people
Christian Union (Netherlands) politicians
Dutch civil servants
Dutch people of Curaçao descent
Members of the House of Representatives (Netherlands)
Open University (Netherlands) alumni
People from Willemstad
United Pentecostal and Evangelical Churches members
21st-century Dutch politicians
21st-century Dutch women politicians